Science Inc. is a Los Angeles-based startup studio that develops, invests in, and acquires various businesses. Science Inc. invests money and offers mastery, to bring corporations to profitability. In 2011, Michael Jones founded the organization and is the current chief executive officer. Jones spent time serving with the company's Chief Executive Officers and investors on strategy, growth, and business development.

Funding
Science Inc. initially received $10 million in backing from well-known investor Eric Schmidt’s Tomorrow Ventures.  In 2013, Science Inc. raised $30 million in funding from Hearst Ventures, the investment arm of media giant Hearst Corporation, and was named to Fast Company’s list of The Most Innovative Companies. Science Inc. also recently raised $20 million in debt financing from Silver Lake Waterman.

Notable affiliated companies

Dollar Shave Club
Dollar Shave Club launched with early investments and support from Science Inc. Science Inc. was Dollar Shave Club’s first investor, before the startup raised a $1 million seed round in March 2012. It was acquired by Unilever in 2016.

DogVacay
Initial funding for the DogVacay was obtained from Science Inc. DogVacay is a Santa Monica based company known for home dog boarding and other pet services.

HelloSociety
Science Inc. funded an incubated HelloSociety, a social media marketing and technology firm that consults on strategic partnerships with influencers and market analytics. The company was purchased by The New York Times in March 2016.

Plowz & Mowz 
In 2016, Science Inc. became one of the first investors in Plowz & Mowz, a gig-marketplace website and app that connects consumers with freelance landscapers. The company began by offering residential snow plowing services and has since expanded its scope to lawn mowing and over a dozen other outdoor home services.

Other
Other startups that have come from Science Inc. include HomeHero, HelloSociety, FameBit, Hello.Me, Stunner Inc., Delicious, Playhaven, Kyoku, and Quarterly. In the year 2016, FameBit was acquired by Google.

In 2015, Science Inc. sold off its mobile advertising network PlayHaven to mobile game publisher RockYou.

The company at the moment focuses on mobile entertainment for millennials, including the popular App "Wishbone", which has more than 3.1 million monthly active users.

References

Companies based in Santa Monica, California
Technology companies based in Greater Los Angeles
2011 establishments in California